Dar El Bey, also known as the government palace  is an old palace in the medina of Tunis, more precisely in the city's Kasbah. Nowadays, it serves as the office of the Head of Government of Tunisia but was used by guests of the State previously. It is located south of Government Square, west of Kasbah Square.

History
The palace was built in the 17th century during the reign of the Muradid Bey Hammuda Pasha Bey. In 1795 the Husainid Bey Hammuda Ibn Ali added another floor to it.
Henri Dunant considers it as «the most beautiful moorish royal house in the world».

It became the main office for the Head of the Tunisian government even before the independence.
Mustapha Kaak was the first to fill that position.

Architecture 
The palace's decoration is very rich and diverse with, as an example, sixteen twisted columns with their arches in white marble: the rooms were designed by Tunisian, Spanish and Moroccan artists. These rooms are distinguished by their special rooftops highly decorated with painted scenes and precious materials, as well as Andalusian style faience. The courtyard is paved in white marble and surrounded by a portico.

References

External links 

El Bey